Dair is the Irish name of the seventh letter of the Ogham alphabet, ᚇ, meaning "oak". The  (Early ) is related to Welsh  and to Breton . Its Proto-Indo-European root was *dóru ("tree"), possibly a deadjectival noun of *deru-, *drew- ("hard, firm, strong, solid"). Its phonetic value is [d].

Dair forms the basis of some first names in Irish Gaelic such as Daire, Dara, Darragh and Daragh.

Bríatharogam
In the medieval kennings, called Bríatharogam or Word Ogham the verses associated with Dair are:

 - "highest tree" in the Word Ogham of Morann mic Moín

 - "handicraft of a craftsman"  in the Word Ogham of Mac ind Óc

 - "most carved of craftsmanship"  in the Word Ogham of Culainn.

References

Ogham letters